MC Kemon (born in Grenada) is a Hungarian retired footballer.

Career

Lemon started his career with MTK Budapest.

References

Hungarian footballers
Living people
Association football midfielders
MTK Budapest FC players
Year of birth missing (living people)